The Pacific Islands Political Studies Association (PIPSA) is an unincorporated association established in Hawaii in 1987 at a meeting of scholars of the Pacific Islands who recognised the need to stimulate and coordinate research and other academic activities to develop our knowledge and understanding of the region. In its early years PIPSA was associated with Brigham Young University in Hawai'i, then the University of Guam, Monash University, the University of Canterbury, Christchurch NZ, and the University of the Sunshine Coast. There has been a commitment from the start for PIPSA to serve the countries and peoples of the region by providing political, economic and social analysis of contemporary issues. PIPSA is now a leading international academic body devoted to the study of the Pacific Islands states and territories; their societies, politics and systems of government, and international relations. While the majority of PIPSA’s members are academics, members also come from the ranks of aid workers, business people, the clergy, military officers, politicians and public servants. PIPSA’s principal activity is a biennial conference held at different locations around the Pacific. PIPSA Conferences have so far been held in Hawai'i, Australia, the Cook Islands, Guam, Palau, New Caledonia, New Zealand, Samoa, Tahiti and Niue. As of 2018, PIPSA’s membership stood at approximately 100. The current executive is:

President: 
Professor Stephanie Lawson, Politics and International Relations, Macquarie University.
Vice-Presidents:
Associate Professor Malakai Koloamatangi, Pasifika Director, Massey University;
Dr Iati Iati, Lecturer in Politics, Otago University.
Immediate Past President:
Professor Steven Ratuva, Director, Macmillan Brown Centre for Pacific Research, University of Canterbury.
Secretary-Treasurer:
Dr Kerryn Baker, Research Fellow, SSGM, Australian National University.

Executive Committee Members:
Charles Hawksley
Nicole Georgeou
Tim  Fadgen
Catherine Ris
Lynda Tabuya
Carine David

Publication Committee Members:
Semir Alwadi
David Hegarty
Nicole Georgeou
Michael Leach

External links
 PIPSA at the University of Auckland 

Organizations established in 1987
Brigham Young University–Hawaii